David John Butcher (born 19 September 1948) is a former New Zealand politician of the Labour Party. He was a Cabinet minister in the Fourth Labour Government.

Early life and family
Butcher was born in Brighton, England, on 19 September 1948, the son of Dorothy May Butcher (née Guppy) and Frank George Butcher. The family migrated to New Zealand in 1963, and he attended Karamu High School in Hastings with broadcaster Paul Holmes, and Victoria University of Wellington. While at Victoria, he was president of the Victoria University Labour Club. He graduated with an economics degree and became a member of the New Zealand Association of Economists. From 1972 to 1974, he worked as an economist in the Labour Department, Wellington. During 1974–75 he travelled overseas in Asia and Europe. From 1976 until 1978, he was a field officer for the Wellington Clerical Workers' Union and the New Zealand Labourers' Union in Hawke's Bay. He was a member of the Hawkes Bay Trade Council and its nominee on the council of the Hawkes Bay Community College.

Butcher became a naturalised New Zealand citizen in 1975, and in 1980, Butcher married Mary Georgina Hall.

Political career

Prior to entering parliament he was a member of the New Zealand Council of Labour Party. In 1983 he was appointed as Labour's spokesperson for State Insurance and the Government Life Office by Labour leader David Lange. In 1986 he represented the New Zealand government at an agricultural ministers conference in Hobart.

During the Fourth Labour Government, Butcher served as a Cabinet minister, with posts including Minister of Commerce, Minister of Energy, Minister of Trade and Industry and Postmaster-General. As Minister of Energy, Butcher had responsibility for ensuring that privatised utilities operated in a competitive environment, or were subjected to appropriate regulation. He was also associate Minister of Finance and mostly a supporter of the Rogernomics agenda of finance minister Roger Douglas. As Minister of Energy he sold the government-owned Petrocorp for $801 million to Rossport Investments Ltd on 31 March 1988.

He represented the Hastings electorate in Parliament until 1990, when he was defeated by National's Jeff Whittaker, one of a number of losses contributing to the fall of the Fourth Labour Government. His defeat was not expected with most expecting him to be re-elected with a reduced majority.

In 1990, Butcher was awarded the New Zealand 1990 Commemoration Medal.

Life after politics
Since 1990, Butcher has been the manager of David Butcher and Associates (DBA), and has worked on assignments in several countries. He worked in a business consultancy deal with the Asian Development Bank. In 2000, he was fined $10,000 plus reparations, for fraudulently claiming expenses on airline tickets under a travel rebate scheme for former MPs.

Notes

References

|-

1948 births
Living people
Members of the Cabinet of New Zealand
New Zealand Labour Party MPs
People from Hastings, New Zealand
People educated at Karamu High School
Unsuccessful candidates in the 1969 New Zealand general election
Unsuccessful candidates in the 1972 New Zealand general election
Unsuccessful candidates in the 1975 New Zealand general election
Unsuccessful candidates in the 1990 New Zealand general election
Members of the New Zealand House of Representatives
New Zealand MPs for North Island electorates
People from Brighton
English emigrants to New Zealand
Naturalised citizens of New Zealand
Victoria University of Wellington alumni
New Zealand trade unionists